This is a list of the reptile species recorded on Christmas Island. At the time of human settlement in the late 19th century, the island had five native species of lizard and one native snake. However, additional species were introduced during the 20th century, resulting in dramatic declines in the island's native reptile populations.

Lizards 

Christmas Island had five native lizard species at the time of human settlement, although the Christmas Island forest skink (Emoia nativitatis) is now considered extinct, and the blue-tailed skink (Cryptoblepharus egeriae) and Lister's gecko (Lepidodactylus listeri) are extinct in the wild. Three additional species were introduced during the 20th century.

Snakes 
Christmas Island has one endemic snake species, the Christmas Island blind snake (Ramphotyphlops exocoeti). The flowerpot blind snake (Ramphotyphlops braminus) had been introduced to the island by 1940, and the Oriental wolf snake (Lycodon capucinus) was introduced in the 1980s.

Turtles 

Green turtles (Chelonia mydas) and, more rarely, hawksbill turtles (Eretmochelys imbricata) have been documented to nest on Christmas Island. Sea turtle nesting occurs on Dolly Beach, on a small area of sand above the high tide level, and occasionally at Greta Beach.

See also 

 List of birds of Christmas Island
 List of mammals of Christmas Island

References 

rep
Reptiles
Christmas Island